Poľana Mountains Protected Landscape Area is one of the 14 protected landscape areas in Slovakia. The Landscape Area is situated in the Poľana Mountains, part of the Slovenské stredohorie Mountains, in Central Slovakia. It is situated in the Banská Bystrica, Brezno, Detva, and Zvolen districts.

Poľana was declared a UNESCO biosphere reserve on 27 March 1990.

History
The Protected Landscape Area was established on 12 August 1981, and the law was amended on 3 September 2004. Protected areas declared before include the national nature reserves of Badínsky prales Old Growth Forest (1913), Zadná Poľana (1953) and Boky (1964),
 and the nature monuments of Bátovský balvan Rock (1964) and Kalamárka (1977).

Geography

References

External links
Poľana PLA at Slovakia.travel
Podpoľanie Region situated at Poľana

Protected areas of Slovakia
Biosphere reserves of Slovakia
Protected areas established in 1981
Protected areas of the Western Carpathians
Geography of Banská Bystrica Region
Tourist attractions in Banská Bystrica Region